Guatemala competed at the 2016 Summer Olympics in Rio de Janeiro, Brazil, from 5 to 21 August 2016. This was the nation's fourteenth appearance at the Summer Olympics since its debut in 1952, despite failing to register any athletes in three other editions (1956 to 1964).

Guatemalan Olympic Committee confirmed a team of 21 athletes, 15 men and 6 women, to compete in 10 sports. It was the nation's largest delegation sent to the Olympics since 1996, surpassing the record of 19 athletes set in London 2012.

Among the Guatemalan athletes, two of them returned for their third consecutive appearance in Rio de Janeiro: badminton player Kevin Cordón and Laser sailor Juan Ignacio Maegli. Other notable athletes also featured siblings Enrique and Hebert Brol in double trap shooting, long-distance freestyle swimmer Valerie Gruest, the youngest of the team (aged 17), and race walker Erick Barrondo, who emerged as the nation's first Olympic medalist in 2012. The most successful athlete of the Games, Barrondo was originally selected to carry the Guatemalan flag, but decided to focus on his training instead for the competition. Artistic gymnast and Youth Olympian Ana Sofía Gómez took Barrondo's spot at the last minute to lead the team in the opening ceremony, the second female in history since swimmer Gisela Morales did so in 2004.

Unlike the previous Games, Guatemala left Rio de Janeiro without a single Olympic medal. Among the Guatemalans competing at these Games, only Maegli improved upon his ninth-place feat from London 2012 to produce the best result for the team, finishing eighth in Laser sailing.

Athletics (track and field)
 
Guatemalan athletes have so far achieved qualifying standards in the following athletics events (up to a maximum of 3 athletes in each event):

Track & road events
Men

Women

Badminton

Guatemala has qualified one badminton player for the men's singles into the Olympic tournament. Remarkably going to his third Olympics, three-time Pan American Games champion Kevin Cordón had claimed his Olympic spot as one of top 34 individual shuttlers in the BWF World Rankings as of 5 May 2016.

Cycling

Road
Guatemala has qualified one rider in the men's Olympic road race by virtue of his top 20 individual ranking in the 2015 UCI America Tour.

Gymnastics

Artistic
Guatemala has entered one artistic gymnast into the Olympic competition. Ana Sofía Gómez claimed her Olympic spot in the women's apparatus and all-around events at the Olympic Test Event in Rio de Janeiro.

Women

Judo

Guatemala has qualified one judoka for the men's extra-lightweight category (60 kg) at the Games. José Ramos earned a continental quota spot from the Pan American region as Guatemala's top-ranked judoka outside of direct qualifying position in the IJF World Ranking List of May 30, 2016.

Modern pentathlon
 
Guatemalan athletes have qualified for the following spots to compete in modern pentathlon. Charles Fernández and Isabel Brand secured a selection each in the men's and women's event respectively after obtaining one of the five Olympic slots from the Pan American Games.

Sailing
 
Guatemalan sailors have qualified one boat in the men's Laser class by claiming an Olympic berth at the 2014 ISAF Sailing World Championships.

M = Medal race; EL = Eliminated – did not advance into the medal race

Shooting
 
Guatemalan shooters have achieved quota places for the following events as a result of their best finish at the 2015 ISSF World Cup series and at the 2015 Pan American Games, as long as they obtained a minimum qualifying score (MQS) by March 31, 2016.

Qualification Legend: Q = Qualify for the next round; q = Qualify for the bronze medal (shotgun)

Swimming

Guatemalan swimmers have so far achieved qualifying standards in the following events (up to a maximum of 2 swimmers in each event at the Olympic Qualifying Time (OQT), and potentially 1 at the Olympic Selection Time (OST)):

Weightlifting

Guatemala has received an unused quota place from IWF to send a male weightlifter to the Olympics.

See also
Guatemala at the 2015 Pan American Games

References

External links 

 

Nations at the 2016 Summer Olympics
2016
2016 in Guatemalan sport